Pleš is a small settlement west of Hinje in the Municipality of Žužemberk in southeastern Slovenia. The area is part of the traditional region of Lower Carniola. The municipality is now included in the Southeast Slovenia Statistical Region.

References

External links
Pleš at Geopedia

Populated places in the Municipality of Žužemberk